Nagoya Kinko (long name: Nagoya Kinnosachihiko) was a Japanese baseball team that played in the Japanese Baseball League (JBL) before it merged with another team. It was owned by the daily broadsheet Nagoya Shimbun. Notable players for the team over the course of its existence included Harris McGalliard and Toshio Kurosawa.

The club was founded as the Nagoya Golden Dolphins before the 1936 JBL season. In 1937 the team changed its name to Nagoya Kinko. 

The franchise never had a winning record and never placed higher than fourth in the league standings. Few players wanted to play for the team,and it merged with the Tsubasa Baseball Club after the 1940 season to form the Taiyō Baseball Club (that franchise was itself dissolved following the 1943 JBL season).

Team statistics

References 

Defunct baseball teams in Japan
Baseball teams established in 1936
Baseball teams disestablished in 1940
1936 establishments in Japan
1940 disestablishments in Japan